Dortmund-Scharnhorst station is located between the Dortmund suburbs of Alt-Scharnhorst and Brackel in the German state of North Rhine-Westphalia on the Dortmund–Hamm line on Flughafenstraße.

History 

During the construction of Dortmund Hauptbahnhof a freight rail bypass was built between Scharnhorst and Nette in 1903 along with the Scharnhorst marshalling yard, where a passenger station was initially established for railway staff. On 6 May 1926, the station became available for normal passenger services following the construction of the first Dortmund airport nearby and the station was renamed Bahnhof Dortmund-Flughafen (Dortmund Airport station). Although the airport closed in 1959, the station retained the name until 31 May 1986. During the construction of the station a small station building was also built with a waiting room, a ticket counter, baggage storage and a bike shed.

Station
Today the station has no station building anymore; in its place there is the Dortmund-Scharnhorst signal box. The two platforms are connected by an old steel bridge running parallel to the road bridge. At the western end of the station another and more modern pedestrian and cycle bridge also connects the two platforms together.

Services
Dortmund-Scharnhorst station is served by the NRW-Express (RE 1, every second hour) and the Rhein-Emscher-Express (RE 3).

The station is also served by bus route 420 (Scharnhorst – Derne + Brackel – Aplerbeck), operated by Dortmunder Stadtwerke (DSW21) at 20-minute intervals.

References

External links

Railway stations in Dortmund
Railway stations in Germany opened in 1928